is a Japanese actress.

Career
Jun Fubuki received a Japanese Academy Award Best Supporting Actress nomination for her role in Muno no Hito, and won at the Hochi Film Awards. This role also won Fubuki the "Best Actress" award at the Yokohama Film Festival. She also won the award for best actress at the 24th Hochi Film Award for Coquille and Spellbound.

She has appeared in Kiyoshi Kurosawa's films such as Seance, Charisma and Pulse.

Filmography

Film

 Hi no Tori (1978)
 The Resurrection of the Golden Wolf (1979)
 Kemono Tachi no Atsui Nemuri (1981)
 Space Adventure Cobra (1982)
 The Tale of Genji (1987)
 Muno no Hito (1991)
 The Games Teachers Play (1992)
 Tora-San Makes Excuses (1992)
 Samurai Kids (1993)
 It's a Summer Vacation Everyday (1994)
 Goodbye for Tomorrow (1995)
 Koi to Hanabi to Kanransha (1997)
 Tsuribaka Nisshi 9 (1997)
 The Stupid Teacher (1998)
 Coquille (1999)
 Charisma (1999)
 Jubaku: Spellbound (1999)
 Seance (2000) (television film)
 Pickpocket (2000)
 Pulse (2001)
 Through the Night (2002)
 Tegami (2003)
 Pretty Woman (2003)
 Guzen nimo Saiaku na Shonen (2003)
 Kamachi (2004)
 Riyuu (2004)
 Tatchi (2005)
 Tobi ga Kururi to (2005)
 Veronika Decides to Die (2005)
 Island of Light (2006)
 Tales from Earthsea (2006)
 The Summer of Stickleback (2006)
 Awakening (2007)
 From Up on Poppy Hill (2011)
 Rebirth (2011)
 Bunny Drop (2011)
 Tokyo Family (2013), Kayo
 Like Father, Like Son (2013)
 Our Little Sister (2015)
 What a Wonderful Family! (2016), Kayo
 Mukoku (2017)
 What a Wonderful Family! 2 (2017), Kayo
 What a Wonderful Family! 3: My Wife, My Life (2018), Kayo
 Restaurant from the Sky (2018)
 At the End of the Matinee (2019), Nobuko Komine
 Your Eyes Tell (2020)
 The Asadas (2020)
 Arc (2021)
 Sensei, Would You Sit Beside Me? (2021)
 Let Me Hear It Barefoot (2022)
 Fullmetal Alchemist: The Revenge of Scar (2022), Pinako Rockbell
 Fullmetal Alchemist: The Final Alchemy (2022), Pinako Rockbell
 Call Me Chihiro (2023), Tae

Television

 Tantei Monogatari (1980)
 Ashura no Gotoku (1979,1980)
 Sailor Suit and Machine Gun (1982)
 Under One Roof (1993)
 Kono Ai ni Ikite (1994)
 Saikou no Kataomoi (1995)
 Pure (1996)
 Hitotsu Yane no Shita 2 (1997)
 Riso no Joshi (1997)
 Ao no Jidai (1998)
 Shin Oretachi no Tabi (1999)
 Honmamon (2001)
 Satorare (2002)
 Shoro Nagashi (2002)
 Toshishita no Otoko (2003)
 Tokio (2004)
 Orange Days (2004)
 Minna Mukashi wa Kodomo Datta (2005)
 Walkers (2006)
 Rondo (2006)
 Furin Kazan (2007) – Lady Ōi
 Yae's Sakura (2013) – Yamamoto Saku
 Asa ga Kita (2015) – Yono Shirooka
 Half Blue Sky (2018)
 Mikazuki (2019)
 A Day-Off of Kasumi Arimura (2020) – Kasumi's mother
 Japan Sinks: People of Hope (2021) – Yoshie Amami

Honours
Kinuyo Tanaka Award (2020)

References

External links
 
 

1952 births
Living people
Japanese actresses
People from Toyama (city)
Musicians from Toyama Prefecture